Pherosphaera is a genus of conifers belonging to the family Podocarpaceae.

Its native range is Southeastern Australia.

Both species are evergreen shrubs. They are dioecious, with male and female flowers on separate plants.

Species
Species:

Pherosphaera fitzgeraldii 
Pherosphaera hookeriana

References

Podocarpaceae
Podocarpaceae genera
Dioecious plants